TWiT.tv, which is the operating trade name of TWiT LLC, is a podcast network that broadcasts many technology news podcasts, founded by technology broadcaster and author Leo Laporte in 2005, and run by his wife and company CEO Lisa Laporte. The network began operation in April 2005 with the launch of This Week in Tech. Security Now was the second podcast on the network, debuting in August of that year. The network hosts 28 podcasts (as of July, 2020) though the number had fallen in half to only 14 regularly scheduled shows by January 2021. Podcasts include The Tech Guy, This Week in Tech, This Week in Enterprise Tech, Security Now, FLOSS Weekly, and MacBreak Weekly. In addition to shows on technology news, TWiT also has podcasts like Hands-On Photography".

TWiT founder and owner Leo Laporte, in an October 2009 speech, stated that it grossed revenues of $1.5 million per year, while costs were around $350,000. In November 2014, during an interview with American Public Media's Marketplace Leo Laporte stated that TWiT makes $6 million in ad revenue a year from 5 million TWiT podcasts downloaded each month, mostly in the form of audio, and that 3,000 to 4,000 people watch its live-streamed shows. On March 18, 2015, prior to the filming of This Week in Google, Leo Laporte stated that TWiT expects to make $7 million in revenue in fiscal year 2015, and made "almost" $10 million in revenue in 2016.

TWiT gets its name from its first and flagship podcast, This Week in Tech. The logo design originated from a traditional logic gate symbol of an "AND gate" turned on its side. Voiceovers are provided by Jim Cutler.

Programming 
TWiT's podcasts are centered around technology and technology news. Hosts of the shows are usually experts in certain fields, either by working in the field itself or by being a journalist covering the field.

As of August 2019, there are 17 podcasts produced by TWiT.

All the shows are available free to watch or download from the TWiT.tv website and are funded by cost per mille embedded sponsorship. Most of the shows are livestreamed from the TWiT studio in Petaluma, California. TWiT's servers host the network's chat rooms using the Internet Relay Chat.

On April 18, 2021, Leo Laporte announced a new paid tier called "Club TWiT" which allows access to member-only podcasts, ad-free podcast feeds, and a members-only Discord server.

Shows

The TWiT Network is host to the following shows

Retired Shows

The following are the shows that have been retired from the network:

Litigation
In May 2017, Twitter announced that it would deliver original video content on its platform. Lawyers from TWiT believed this violated a spoken agreement between Leo Laporte and Twitter co-founder Evan Williams made in 2009, and infringed on TWiT's trademark. TWiT tried to informally resolve the trademark issue, and in January 2018 filed a trademark infringement lawsuit against Twitter.

In March 2018 Twitter filed a motion to dismiss. On May 30, 2018, US Magistrate Judge Jaqueline Scott Corley granted Twitters' motion to dismiss the case. The judge found that TWIT's discussions with Twitter "do not support a plausible inference that Twitter agreed to never offer audio or video content under the Twitter brand."

Awards
 This Week in Tech was the recipient of the 2005, 2008, and 2010 People's Choice Podcast Awards in the Technology category and Best Video Podcast in 2009 and 2011. 
 Tech News Today was the recipient of the 2012 International Academy of Web Television award for Best News Web Series. It also won the People's Choice Podcast Awards in the Technology category in 2011 and 2013.
 Security Now was the recipient of the 2007 People's Choice Podcast Awards in the Technology category.
 This Week in Computer Hardware, Home Theater Geeks, NSFW, This Week in Tech, MacBreak Weekly, TWiT Live Specials, iPad Today, Tech News Today, The Tech Guy, This Week in Google, and Windows Weekly were named "Best of 2010 in Podcasts" by iTunes Rewind. 
 In 2011, This Week in Tech was named "Best Technology Podcast", and TWiT Photo'' was named "Best New Technology Podcast" by iTunes Rewind.

See also
This Week in Tech

References

External links

2005 establishments in California
Internet properties established in 2005
Television channels and stations established in 2005
American broadcasters
Companies based in Sonoma County, California
Petaluma, California
Podcasting companies
Internet television channels
Computer television series